Nora Ikstena (born 15 October 1969) is a Latvian writer and cultural manager. She was born in Riga and studied philology and English language and literature at the University of Latvia. After a subsequent period of residence in New York City for further studies, she returned home and worked to establish the Latvian Literature Centre.

Her debut novel Celebration of Life appeared in 1998, and she has written more than twenty books since, several novels, short story collections, biographies and essays. Her recent novel Soviet Milk (2015) was translated into English and published in 2018 by Peirene Press in London. The launch took place on March 7 in the English-language bookstore Robert's Books in Riga. She also represented Latvia at the London Book Fair in 2018 as a featured author and was officially invited to be a participant of the Library of Congress National Book Festival of Washington D.C. in 2016. The book Soviet Milk has been licensed for 15 foreign languages, among them translations in Italian and German.

In 2008 she was honoured with the Order of the Three Stars (officer) of the Republic of Latvia. In 2018 she was honoured with another national Excellence in Culture Award for being the internationally best-known Latvian writer of the 21st century.

References

1969 births
Living people
Writers from Riga
University of Latvia alumni
20th-century Latvian writers
20th-century Latvian women writers
20th-century novelists
21st-century Latvian writers
21st-century Latvian women writers
21st-century novelists
Latvian women novelists